Plata Bridge, listed in Puerto Rico's bridge inventory as Bridge #374 and now also known as Antiguo Puente Plata, was built in 1908.  It is significant as "the only extant large multi span truss bridge in Puerto Rico", according to its nomination document for listing on the National Register of Historic Places.  It includes two Parker truss spans and was built in 1908.  It brought what is now Puerto Rico Highway 167 across the Rio La Plata, spanning from Bayamon municipality into and Naranjito, and connected several mountain towns to the coastal road along Puerto Rico's north coast.

The masonry includes ashlar buttresses and relief decoration. A contractor, Jose Lago, built its masonry supports for $9,000. The trusses cost $13,228 and were manufactured by the prolific American Bridge Co.  They were installed by American Bridge Co.'s subsidiary Groton Bridge Co.  It was one of nine steel bridges built in 1908 that were financed by Puerto Rico's first public works bond issue, of 1906, which raised $1 million.

It was listed on the National Register of Historic Places in 1995.  At the time, the setting was relatively unchanged from its date of construction, although a modern bridge had been built adjacent to it.  And it was deemed to have "a high degree of integrity of design, workmanship, feeling, association, materials, and setting."  Its condition was then judged "fair".

It is now unused. The modern bridge that carries traffic is on the upstream side of the historic bridge. On August 28, 2017 the bridge collapsed, thus being an unstable half of the historic bridge.

Gallery

References

External links

Summary sheet from the Puerto Rico State Historic Preservation Office 

National Register of Historic Places in Bayamón, Puerto Rico
Bridges completed in 1908
Road bridges on the National Register of Historic Places in Puerto Rico
Naranjito, Puerto Rico
1908 establishments in Puerto Rico
Steel bridges
Parker truss bridges